Tangeite, also known as calciovolborthite, is a calcium, copper vanadate mineral with formula: CaCu(VO4)(OH). It occurs as a secondary mineral that can be found in sandstone and also in the oxidized zones of vanadium bearing deposits. 

It was named in 1925 by Aleksandr Evgenievich Fersman for its discovery locality in the Tange Gorge, Ferghana Valley, Alai Mountains, Kyrgyzstan.

References

Vanadate minerals
Copper(II) minerals
Orthorhombic minerals
Minerals in space group 19
Minerals described in 1925